Rostyslav Lyakh (born 12 October 2000) is a Ukrainian professional footballer who plays as a midfielder for Rukh Lviv.

Career
Lyakh is a product of the FC Karpaty Lviv School Sportive System.

He made his debut for FC Karpaty as a substitute in the derby match against FC Lviv on 19 October 2019 in the Ukrainian Premier League.

References

External links

2000 births
Living people
People from Mukachevo
Ukrainian footballers
Association football midfielders
Ukrainian Premier League players
Ukrainian Second League players
Ukraine youth international footballers
Ukraine under-21 international footballers
FC Karpaty Lviv players
FC Rukh Lviv players
FC Karpaty Halych players
Sportspeople from Zakarpattia Oblast